Aphendala recta is a moth of the family Limacodidae first described by George Hampson in 1893. It is found in Sri Lanka.

Forewings grayish brown with indistinct external fasciae. A pale ovoid shading near the outer margin of forewing. There is a distinct white distal border of the medial fascia. Larval food plant is Camellia sinensis.

References

Moths of Asia
Moths described in 1893
Limacodidae